Willie McKelton (born July 3, 1949) is a retired gridiron football player who played for the Ottawa Rough Riders, and Portland Storm. He played college football at Southern University.

References

1949 births
Living people
Southern Jaguars football players
Ottawa Rough Riders players